The State Service of Emergency Situations is the emergencies and civil defense ministry of the unrecognized Republic of Artsakh (known regionally as Nagorno-Karabakh). The ministry is authorized to make decisions on the protection of the population from natural disasters and other geological processes. The current director is Mekhak Arzumanyan. From May 2020 to January, Karen Grigory Sargsyan was the Director of the Service. It is subordinated to the Cabinet of Ministers. The militarized units of the service are regulated according to the NKR laws "On Conscription", and "On entering the military service". The professional holiday of the service is celebrated on 31 October, known as the Day of the Emergency Workers.

Actions 
It has served during the following conflicts:

 2019 Earthquake along the Artsakh-Azerbaijan border
 July 2020 Armenian–Azerbaijani clashes
 2020 Nagorno-Karabakh conflict

See also 

 State Emergency Service of Ukraine
 Ministry of Emergency Situations (Armenia)

References 

Executive branch of the government of the Republic of Artsakh
Civil defense